{|
{{Infobox ship image
| Ship image = RFA Tidesurge (A98) refuels USS Forrestal (CVA-59) on 25 August 1967 (02).jpg
| Ship caption = RFA Tidesurge (A98)
}}

|}
The Tide class was a series of six replenishment oilers used by the British Royal Fleet Auxiliary (RFA), the Royal Australian Navy (RAN), and the Chilean Navy.

Three ships were laid down for the RFA in 1953, with a fourth being ordered by the RAN at the same time. Two more ships, built for the RFA to a modified design, were launched in 1962.

Upon completion, the Australian Tide Austral could not be accepted into service because of manpower and financial difficulties. She was paid off in 1985.

The first three ships were removed from service and scrapped during the late 1970s. The two modified ships, Tidespring and Tidepool saw service in the Falklands War, after which Tidepool was sold to the Chilean Navy and renamed Almirante Jorge Montt.  Tidespring remained with the RFA and was scrapped in 1992. Supply'' remained with the RAN until 1985.

Ships

See also
List of replenishment ships of the Royal Fleet Auxiliary
List of Royal Australian Navy ships
MARS tanker - new class of RFA replenishment ships that will reuse some of the Tide names

References

Citations

Sources

 
Auxiliary replenishment ship classes
Tankers of the Royal Fleet Auxiliary